General Howe refers to William Howe, 5th Viscount Howe (1729–1814), Commander-in-Chief of British forces during the American War of Independence. General Howe may also refer to:

Albion P. Howe (1818–1897), Union Army brigadier general and brevet major general
Emanuel Scrope Howe (c. 1663–1709), British Army lieutenant general
George Howe, 3rd Viscount Howe (1725–1758), British Army general
John H. Howe (judge) (1801–1873), Union Army brevet brigadier general
Richard Curzon-Howe, 3rd Earl Howe (1822–1900), British peer and professional soldier
Robert Howe (Continental Army officer) (1732–1786), Continental Army general during the American Revolutionary War
William F. Howe (general) (1888–1952), U.S. Army brigadier general

See also
Attorney General Howe (disambiguation)